Tarbert Power Station is an oil fired power station situated on the Shannon Estuary in Tarbert, County Kerry, Ireland. Construction commenced in October 1966 and the first block was commissioned in 1969. The station comprises two  (Unit I and II) and two  oil fired steam turbines. It was the largest station of ESB during the 1980s. The plant was sold to Endesa in 2009, and subsequently to SSE in 2012. Until early 2022 it was scheduled for closure by the end of 2023. However, due to the 2021–2023 global energy crisis, Tarbert station will maintain operation for an indefinite amount of time, until enough low-carbon generating capacity will be available as a replacement.

In 2003 Tarbert was the site of an explosion that killed two workers and seriously injured another. In September 2022 one boiler was damaged by a fire, which led to loss of half of block 3's generating capacity, . The generator is expected to return to full capacity in February 2023.

Units:

References

External links

 SSE Thermal: Tarbert Power Plant

Oil-fired power stations in the Republic of Ireland